The Cape crow or black crow (Corvus capensis) is slightly larger (48–50 cm in length) than the carrion crow and is completely black with a slight gloss of purple in its feathers. It has proportionately longer legs, wings and tail too and has a much longer, slimmer bill that seems to be adapted for probing into the ground for invertebrates. The head feathers have a coppery-purple gloss and the throat feathers are quite long and fluffed out in some calls and displays.

Distribution and habitat
This species occurs in two large separate regions of the African continent. One form ranges from the Cape at the southern tip of Africa up to southern Angola and across to the east coast of Mozambique. The other population occurs in a large area from South Sudan, Ethiopia, Tanzania and Kenya in central east Africa. The more northern population is on average slightly smaller than the southern. It inhabits open grassland, moorland, agricultural areas with some trees or woodland in the vicinity for nesting. It seems to thrive especially in agricultural areas.

Behaviour

Diet
As far as feeding is concerned, it eats grain and other seeds, invertebrates which it digs for with powerful downward stabs of its long bill. It opens corncob kernels before they are fully ripe, bulbs and fleshy roots of certain plants, frogs and small reptiles, fruits and berries. It takes the eggs and chicks of ground nesting birds and has been known to kill birds of up to a pound in weight (especially domestic poultry). It turns over the droppings of mammals for insects.

Nesting
Nesting is always in trees, usually near the top. It has been known to nest in shrubs but much less frequently. There are usually 3-4 eggs incubated over 18–19 days and fledged by around 38 days. Usually only 3 nestlings survive.

Voice
The voice is described as a "krrah.....krrah.....krrah" or a quicker "kah-kah-kah". It also makes very loud, liquid bubbling sounds that carry quite a distance and also gives throaty chuckles. There is evidence that vocal mimicry is practised too.

References

External links
 (Black Crow = ) Cape Crow - Species text in The Atlas of Southern African Birds.

Photo Image Links
 Good profile shot
 Cape Crow or Black Crow
 Cape Crow or Black Crow in ploughed field

Video Links
 Cape Crow videos on the Internet Bird Collection

Corvus
Birds of East Africa
Birds of Southern Africa
Birds described in 1823